The Beattystown Historic District is a historic district in the village of Beattystown, Mansfield Township, Warren County, New Jersey. The district was added to the National Register of Historic Places on September 28, 1990 for its significance in architecture, commerce, industry, and settlement pattern from 1762 to 1929. It includes 32 contributing buildings.

History
Beattystown was founded  with establishment of the George Beatty Mill along the Musconetcong River.

Gallery of contributing properties

References

Mansfield Township, Warren County, New Jersey
National Register of Historic Places in Warren County, New Jersey
New Jersey Register of Historic Places
Buildings and structures in Warren County, New Jersey
Historic districts on the National Register of Historic Places in New Jersey
Greek Revival architecture in New Jersey
Queen Anne architecture in New Jersey